Jaume Mateu (1382–1452) was a Valencian painter of the Gothic style. The nephew and collaborator of Pere Nicolau, he is known to have worked in Valencia from 1402 to 1453.

Works attributed to him include the Adoration of the Shepherds (1430, part of an altarpiece now disappeared) in the museum of Cortes de Arenoso and a Nativity (1430). He participated in the coffer decoration of the Golden Hall Llotja de la Seda. 

He is known to have taken commissions from patrons in Teruel and Barcelona.

Sources

1382 births
1452 deaths
People from Valencia
Painters from the Valencian Community
Gothic painters